Frithjof Sælen may refer to:

Frithjof Sælen (gymnast) (1892–1975), Norwegian gymnast
Frithjof Sælen (writer) (1917–2004), Norwegian writer, son of the former